Saadettin Erokay (born 20 May 1909, date of death unknown) was a Turkish equestrian. He competed in the individual eventing at the 1936 Summer Olympics.

References

1909 births
Year of death missing
Turkish male equestrians
Olympic equestrians of Turkey
Equestrians at the 1936 Summer Olympics
Place of birth missing